Linkwood Wildlife Management Area is a  Wildlife Management Area in the state of Maryland. It is located in Dorchester County, near the town of Linkwood.

References

External links
 Linkwood Wildlife Management Area

Wildlife management areas of Maryland
Protected areas of Dorchester County, Maryland